The women's pentathlon at the 2016 IAAF World Indoor Championships took place on March 18, 2016.

Returning silver medalist Brianne Theisen-Eaton came in with high expectations.  She started the 60m hurdles with the fastest time of the day.  Her high jump was the second best putting her firmly in the lead.  In the shot put, Theisen-Eaton's 13.70 put her in the middle of the field, but paled in comparison to Alina Fyodorova's 15.44 personal best.  And Anastasiya Mokhnyuk's 15.01 pushed both Ukrainian women ahead.  In the Long Jump, extended her lead with a 6.66 personal best, while Fyodorova maintained second place.  Going into the final event, the 800 metres, the medalists were apparently settled, Theisen-Eaton over a hundred points ahead of 4th place Györgyi Zsivoczky-Farkas but 36 points behind Fodorova and 140 points behind Mokhnyuk.  Theisen-Eaton's faster 800 expected to overtake Fodorova for silver.  In the race, Barbara Nwaba charged out to the lead with Theisen-Eaton marking her through 30 and 33 second laps.  Even with the fast first half of the race, by the end of the third lap the lead pair had not dropped the pack enough to change the outcome.  But Theisen-Eaton launched into a sprint that ultimately beat Nwaba to the finish line, a personal best 2:09.99 worth 965 points.  Nwaba's 2:10.07 gave her enough of a gap on Zsivoczky-Farkas to get 4th place by 5 points.  Further behind were Fodorova and even further to Mokhnyuk.  Not only had Theisen-Eaton advanced to silver, she gained enough to get gold.

Less than a month after the event, Mokhnyuk tested positive for meldonium.  The IAAF officially disqualified her in January 2019 and awarded the bronze medal Barbara Nwaba. Meldonium was only added to the list of prohibited substances on January 1, 2016.  WADA is investigating whether a plethora of positive test results from early 2016 could be the residual result of usage prior to the ban.

Results

60 metres hurdles
The 60 metres hurdles were started at 11:15.

High jump
The high jump was started at 12:15.

Shot put

The shot put was started at 14:25.

Long jump
The long jump was started at 17:15.

800 metres

The 800 metres were started at 20:10.

Final standing
After all events.

References

Pentathlon
Combined events at the World Athletics Indoor Championships
2016 in women's athletics